Sheet explosives are materials formed by combining an explosive with a "rubberizer"—a flexible binding agent.  The resulting compound is cast into a flat sheet which is typically pliable and deformable over a wide range of temperature.  Typical products are generally shock-insensitive secondary explosives, requiring a blasting cap or other detonator.

Detonation velocities are frequently very high, which can improve the detonation synchronicity across the area of a tertiary charge with a low detonation velocity.  This property makes them suitable for use in detonation trains which require precise timing and homogeneous delivery of force across a complex surface (but see also shaped charge for an orthogonal technique).

Applications: As a main charge

Magnetic flux compression generator 
In an explosively-pumped magnetic flux compression generator, explosives are used to accelerate the plates of a large capacitor at each other, while the capacitor has a charge.  The result is a colossal spike in amperage that can be used, in a typical application, to fire a railgun for kinetic effects or a transient electromagnetic munition for electronic warfare applications.  For maximum amperage, the plates must remain parallel as they accelerate towards each other; high detonation velocity is required.  In typical designs, however, the capacitor is not made from two flat plates, but from two concentric cylinders.  Therefore, sheet explosives simplify construction.  The reference cited for this section demonstrates a railgun design using Detasheet C as the sheet explosive.

 Explosive welding
 Explosive forming

Rocketry 

Rocket engines have been created out of a large number of sequentially fired "stages" of sheet explosive discs.  (This approach is a rough conventional-explosive analogue to the Project Orion nuclear rocket, although with many more explosions per second.)  Note that this differs from a pulsed detonation rocket because the fuel consists solely of pre-positioned solid explosives.

The primary advantages of the technique are reliability, stable long-term storage, and the complete absence of any moving parts or pumps for fuel delivery—the design is merely a set of alternating disks of explosives and delayed primers.

Applications: As a boosting charge

Example materials 
 Detasheet (legacy; used in 1980s MFCG/railgun experiments, among others)
 Primasheet (in service as of 2013)

References 

Explosives